Arzenu is an organization for the political representation of Reform and Progressive Religious Zionist communities in Israel and fourteen other countries. It was founded in 1980 as a Brit Olamit in the World Zionist Congress, and is affiliated with the Netzer Olami youth organization.

External links
 http://www.arzenu.org/

Zionist organizations
Reform Zionism
Jewish organizations established in 1980